Gamal Abdelnaser Hanafy Mohamed is an Egyptian freestyle wrestler. In 2019, he represented Egypt at the African Games held in Rabat, Morocco and he won one of the bronze medals in the 57 kg event. He is a four-time medalist, including gold, at the African Wrestling Championships.

In 2021, he competed at the African & Oceania Olympic Qualification Tournament hoping to qualify for the 2020 Summer Olympics in Tokyo, Japan.

He won the gold medal in his event at the 2022 African Wrestling Championships held in El Jadida, Morocco.

Achievements

References

External links 
 

Living people
Year of birth missing (living people)
Place of birth missing (living people)
Egyptian male sport wrestlers
African Games bronze medalists for Egypt
African Games medalists in wrestling
Competitors at the 2019 African Games
African Wrestling Championships medalists
21st-century Egyptian people